Arlington is an unincorporated community and U.S. Post Office in Kiowa County, Colorado, United States.  The ZIP Code of the Arlington Post Office is 81021.

History
The town of Arlington was established by the Missouri Pacific Railroad in 1887.  The Arlington Post Office opened on August 16, 1887.

Arlington Auxiliary Army Airfield

Three miles east of town is the site of the former Arlingtion Auxiliary Army Air Field #4, one of many former Colorado World War II Army Airfields. The triangular shape of the runways is not only visible from the air, but also visible from the county road. The E/W runway still has large sections of asphalt and the vegetation  has noticeable changes along the runway.

Geography
Arlington is located at  (38.335597,-103.342552).

See also

Outline of Colorado
Index of Colorado-related articles
State of Colorado
Colorado cities and towns
Colorado counties
Kiowa County, Colorado

References

External links

Unincorporated communities in Kiowa County, Colorado
Unincorporated communities in Colorado
Populated places established in 1887